Ivett Kurucz (born 9 May 1994 in Nagyatád) is a Hungarian handballer, who retired from professional handball in 2015. She plays for Csurgói NKC in the second division.

Achievements
Nemzeti Bajnokság I:
Winner: 2011, 2012
Magyar Kupa:
Winner: 2011, 2012
EHF Champions League:
Finalist: 2012
Semifinalist: 2011

References

External links 
 Ivett Kurucz player profile on Győri Audi ETO KC Official Website
 Ivett Kurucz career statistics at Worldhandball

1994 births
Living people
People from Nagyatád
Hungarian female handball players
Győri Audi ETO KC players
Sportspeople from Somogy County